The Rams–Seahawks rivalry is an American football rivalry between the National Football League (NFL)'s Los Angeles Rams and Seattle Seahawks. Geography somewhat comes into play as both Los Angeles and Seattle are approximately 1,100 miles apart along Interstate 5 connected along the western seaboard of the continental United States. The Seahawks lead the series 27–24. The teams have met twice in the playoffs, two Rams wins in the 2004 NFC Wild Card Round and the 2020 NFC Wild Card Round.

History

Beginnings of the Rivalry: 1976-2002
Originally, the Seahawks played in the NFC West during their inaugural season in 1976, but would be realigned to the AFC West the following season. Very little connected the Seahawks with any animosity towards their future rivals in the Rams and 49ers respectively for much of their existence leading up to the 2002 division realignment.

Notably, both the Rams and Seahawks encountered issues with fan attendance and outdated stadiums. The Rams found themselves unable to secure a new stadium in southern California and relocated to St. Louis in 1995. The Seahawks found themselves increasingly unsatisfied with the declining condition of the Kingdome and later threatened to relocate to Los Angeles during the 1996 offseason. Seahawks then-owner Ken Behring had relocated team practices to the Rams’ former training facility in Anaheim briefly, and sought a deal to utilize the Rose Bowl in Pasadena. However, Behring had failed to properly format a bid for relocation and the league was unaware of any possible request or owners meeting regarding the move of the team. The league soon threatened to heavily fine Behring and the Seahawks unless they returned to Seattle immediately. Ultimately, Behring was displeased with his declined request for relocation and later sold the team to Microsoft CEO Paul Allen in 1997.

2002-09: Seahawks join the NFC West/First playoff matchup
The rivalry between the Seahawks and Rams was finally established in 2002, following the Seahawks’ realignment to the NFC West after the league had expanded to 32 teams. The Seahawks entered the division as an upstart playoff contender under third year head coach Mike Holmgren, meanwhile the Rams were experiencing the twilight of their famous Greatest Show On Turf era. The Rams' teams would begin to wane in comparison to their peak under quarterback Kurt Warner, and would only manage to win the division in 2003 for the final time before their relocation back to Los Angeles 13 years later. The 2003 season saw the Rams boast a 12-4 record and take command of the division one final time. The Seahawks would clinch a playoff berth as the divisional runner-up with a 10-6 record, but they would go on to lose in a crushing overtime loss to the Green Bay Packers. The Rams managed to clinch the second highest seed in the conference but would fall in an equally crushing double overtime loss to the eventual Conference Champion Carolina Panthers at home. 

The 2004 season saw the Rams begin the year strong as they managed a 4-2 record to start the season, but they would stumble the rest of the year and lose 6 of 10; finishing one game behind the Seahawks for the division lead. The first playoff matchup between the two teams as divisional rivals would occur in the Wild Card Round of the 2004 playoffs. Despite finishing the year one loss behind Seattle, the Rams managed to sweep them during the regular season, culminating in a high octane grudge match between the two rivals. Out of the gate; the Rams pulled ahead to a 4 point lead despite inconsistent play from quarterback Marc Bulger, The Seahawks would respond with their own passing attack as Matt Hasselbeck managed a quick touchdown and an interception to start the 2nd quarter. The second half would see Seattle briefly take the lead before Bulger managed a 17 yard touchdown with less than 2 minutes remaining in the 3rd quarter. Despite the best efforts of the Seahawks, the Rams refused to give up the lead. Bulger and Hasselbeck would combine for 654 passing yards and the game would also be the final game played by Hall of Fame receiver Jerry Rice. The Rams would not manage another playoff win until the 2018 season, meanwhile Seattle would later boast a 10-game home playoff win streak would that would end in 2020 after Rams beat the Seahawks in the wild card round in 2021.

The late 2000s and early 2010s saw a decline in the rivalry as the Seahawks consistently qualified for the playoffs, while the Rams struggled. Seattle won 10 straight meetings from 2005–09.

2010-15: Resurgent animosity
Despite the sharp decline in competition from the Rams through the earlier half of the decade, moments of animosity between the two teams would still occur during the Rams' final years in St. Louis even whilst Seattle managed to remain a Super Bowl contender and even earned a victory at Super Bowl XLVIII.

During a 2013 game in St. Louis, Seahawks receiver Golden Tate was seen taunting and flashed his middle finger at Rams cornerback Janoris Jenkins following a failed interception on the pass, while Tate returned the ball for a touchdown.

In 2015, Rams punter Johnny Hekker shoved Seahawks defensive end Cliff Avril following a 45-yard punt. Seahawks lineman Michael Bennett later attempted to tackle Hekker for retaliation, and would later refer to Hekker as "acting like a little girl" in the postgame interview. Following the Rams' victory in Seattle during week 16, Bennett would also take shots at Rams star rookie running back Todd Gurley on Twitter, claiming, "he's average to me, personally. I've seen better running backs."

2016: Rams return to Los Angeles
In 2016, the Rams returned to Los Angeles and began playing temporarily at the Los Angeles Memorial Coliseum as SoFi Stadium would be completed in 2020. The first regular season game back in Los Angeles was set against the Seahawks. The game opened with an impromptu concert for those in attendance by the Red Hot Chili Peppers to celebrate the return. Despite a strong showing from Seattle's passing game, they were ultimately unable to achieve a touchdown throughout the game. Meanwhile, the Rams endured similar issues with their quarterback rotation as Case Keenum struggled to stay consistent. The Rams also failed to score any touchdowns; they did, however, manage 3 field goals by Greg Zuerlein. The Rams' stellar defense managed to be the difference-maker within the game as Russell Wilson was sacked 4 times resulting in the Rams winning 9–3. However, the teams headed in opposite directions going forward, the Rams would collapse quickly following the win while the Seahawks managed to stay competitive. The two teams met again during week 15 but this time the Seahawks pulled through with a crushing 24-3 victory over the Rams. The Seahawks would later go on to win the division with a 10–5–1 record while the Rams finished 4–12.

2017–20: Sean McVay era begins in L.A.
The following season, the Rams hired Sean McVay as head coach. Since McVay's arrival, the Rams have won three NFC West titles and have dominated the rivalry, going 8–3 against the Seahawks since 2017. McVay's first game against the Seahawks saw the team put up a decent fight through the first half, but surrendered 2 field goals and a controversial fumble as running back Todd Gurley's run into the endzone was ruled a touchback as he allegedly lost control of the ball. Seattle managed to win 16-10. The two teams met again during week 15 at Centurylink Field with the Rams one game ahead of Seattle for the division lead. The Seahawks would go on to get obliterated 42–7 by the Rams for Seattle's worst home loss of all time, and the 4th worst in franchise history. Aaron Donald finished the game with 3 recorded sacks as Russell Wilson only managed a single touchdown on top of completing 14 of 30 passes. Seattle's defense collapsed with relative ease as Rams' running back Todd Gurley managed 142 rushing yards and 3 touchdowns while Jared Goff threw for 120 yards and 2 more touchdowns on top of that. The Rams achieved a playoff berth following their win over the division despite losing to the 49ers during the week 17 home game. Seattle would be tied with the Carolina Panthers for the lowest remaining wild card spot but would get eliminated following their loss to the Arizona Cardinals the same week.

Starting the 2018 season, the two teams met in Seattle during week 5. Early on in the game, tensions began to run high after an early scuffle between both benches after Rams wide receiver Brandin Cooks suffered an injury resulting from a controversial head-on collision from Seahawks safety Tedric Thompson, though no penalty was given to Seattle. The Rams held on, not to the same intensity as the season prior, but managed to pull off the victory nonetheless with a final score of 36–31. During the week 10 game in Los Angeles, Rams defensive tackle Aaron Donald managed a strip sack of Russell Wilson during the 3rd quarter and managed to recover the ball as he ran out of bounds. Prior to going off the field, Seahawks center Justin Britt threw Donald to the ground, prompting a retaliatory punch from Donald after Britt had also thrown a punch at Rams cornerback Nickell Robey-Coleman. The altercation escalated quickly as Seahawks offensive lineman J.R. Sweezy and Rams cornerback Troy Hill also began throwing punches at one another. Seahawks’ lineman Austin Calitro and Rams’ Defensive End Ethan Westbrooks would have to be separated by officials after also engaging into a fight. Both benches would continue to clear until Sean McVay, Zac Taylor, Doug Baldwin, Jordan Simmons, and Michael Brockers intervened on both sides to mollify the altercation. Following the Rams' 33–31 victory, another large altercation took place at midfield following the game between multiple players as Donald and Britt continued to antagonize one another as both benches cleared. Donald and Britt would each receive a $20,000 fine from the league for the altercation. The Rams would go on to complete their first season sweep of the Seahawks since 2015, en route to a 13–3 record and a Super Bowl LIII appearance. Seattle managed to be the runners-up of the division with their 10–6 record and managed a Wild Card berth against the Dallas Cowboys, though they would go on to lose 22–24.

The 2019 season would reverse fortunes for both teams as the Rams encountered a slump following their Super Bowl loss while the San Francisco 49ers ran away with the division. The two teams met for a Thursday night matchup in Seattle during week 5. The Seahawks managed to deal some damage with their new rookie wide receiver DK Metcalf combined with veteran Tyler Lockett managing a shared 91 receiving yards to boost Seattle through the game. Russell Wilson returned to form with a 4-touchdown performance while Jared Goff managed a lone touchdown and a controversial interception from Tedric Thompson as multiple players on both sides claimed the ball had hit the ground prior to Thompson's grab. Following a challenge from Pete Carroll after the officials ruled the ball an incomplete pass, Seattle was awarded possession after 15 minutes of review. The Rams managed a 9-point comeback through the 4th quarter, but a devastating missed field goal from Greg Zuerlein gave Seattle the victory, 30–29. The Rams would continue to struggle mightily through their Super Bowl Slump as quarterback Jared Goff would begin to exhibit declining play as opposing defenses managed to interrupt the Rams' passing scheme. Entering the week 14 matchup at the LA Coliseum, the Seahawks boasted a 10–2 record while the Rams entered the game with a lowly 7–5 record. Despite the differences in seasons, the Rams managed to put up more of a fight than they had during the previous matchup as they would end the first half up 21–3. During the 2nd quarter, Rams cornerback Jalen Ramsey and DK Metcalf engaged in an altercation following Ramsey breaking up three pass attempts intended for Metcalf. Despite Metcalf's best efforts, Seattle struggled mightily through the game. Seattle scored a pick-6 from newly signed safety Quandre Diggs, but the Rams defense bullied the Seahawks the entire game, managing to sack Russell Wilson 5 times on top of a fumble and an interception. Seattle was now out of the hunt for the division lead as the 49ers would manage to win the division. The Rams finished 2019 with a rough 9–7 record, missing the playoffs due to a sweep from the 49ers; Seattle managed to secure a wild card victory over the Philadelphia Eagles though they would go on to lose against the Green Bay Packers during the divisional round.

The 2020 season started off with the Rams winning the first of the two matchups that year at home in a hard-fought week 10 defeat of the Seahawks 23-16. Seattle entered the matchup 6-2, Los Angeles entered at 5-3. The Rams got to an early lead as Wilson threw two interceptions while Alex Collins gave the Seahawks their only touchdown of the game. However, the second matchup ignited tensions between the two clubs. Seattle was a game ahead of the Rams in the hunt for the division lead as the Rams had lost two critical upsets to the New York Jets and the San Francisco 49ers. The Rams struggled offensively through the entire game as Jared Goff struggled and threw no touchdowns and a critical interception as they lost, 20–9. Seahawks safety Jamal Adams celebrated during a press conference by lighting a cigar and taunting various people on the Rams and declaring "it feels good don’t it Rams?" to the cameras. The Seahawks went on to win the NFC West with a record of 12–4; meanwhile, the Rams managed to clinch a wild card spot with a 10-6 record and the two teams were set to meet in the NFC Wild Card round in Seattle.

Leading up to that game, Seattle had not lost a home playoff game since losing to the Rams in 2004. The Rams had benched Goff prior to the game due to a fracture within his thumb and were forced to start backup quarterback John Wolford. In the first quarter, Jamal Adams landed an illegal low helmet-to-helmet hit on Wolford, knocking him out of the game. Goff was forced to play off the bench and led the Rams to a 30–20 victory over the Seahawks, ending their 10-game home playoff winning streak. Following the game, Rams cornerback Jalen Ramsey was seen on the field by cameras, celebrating and exclaiming the Seahawks should "they outta take their hat and their T-shirts down to Cabo for the rest of the off-season." Goff also voiced his initial satisfaction with the victory as he felt offended by Adams' cigar gesture.

2021-present: Current decline of the Seahawks

During the offseason, the Seahawks sought to lure Rams tight end Gerald Everett in free agency, in addition to their hiring of Rams passing game coordinator Shane Waldron as their offensive coordinator. Meanwhile, the Rams traded Goff and several draft picks to the Detroit Lions in exchange for quarterback Matthew Stafford.

In week 6 of the  season,  the Rams offense fought with more potency after halftime in which they trailed the Seahawks by four points. The Rams went on to score 13 unanswered points through the 3rd quarter as their defense terrorized the Seahawks. During the quarter, Aaron Donald deflected a pass from Wilson, which dislocated his finger and forced him onto the bench. Wilson's finger later put him on injured reserve as the Seahawks were forced to start Geno Smith. Smith would perform rather poorly despite putting up one touchdown—he threw a critical interception to end the fourth quarter, giving the Rams the victory. Seattle would be eliminated from playoff contention later in the season with a loss to the Chicago Bears; meanwhile the Rams finished 12–5 and eventually won Super Bowl LVI. The Seahawks finished the season at 7–10 with their first losing record since 2011, last place in the NFC West.

In the 2022 off-season, Seattle traded longtime quarterback Russell Wilson to the Denver Broncos. Most notably, Rams star defensive tackle Aaron Donald had recorded 15 sacks against Seattle, more than any other opponent, along with the most sacks of quarterback Russell Wilson by a team in his career. The Seahawks also made the decision to release Pro Bowl linebacker Bobby Wagner, the final remaining member of the Legion of Boom defense. Originally a native of Southern California, Wagner would ironically choose to sign with the Rams on March 31 for a 5-year contract worth up to $65 million.

Game results

|-
| 
| style="| Rams  45–6
| Los Angeles Memorial Coliseum
| Rams  1–0
| Seahawks join NFL as an expansion team and are placed in the NFC West. The following season, they were moved to the AFC West, where they remained through .
|-
| 
| style="| Rams  24–0
| Kingdome
| Rams  2–0
| First meeting in Seattle. Rams hold Seahawks to minus seven yards, the lowest offensive output in NFL history. Rams lose Super Bowl XIV and move to Anaheim the following season.
|-
| 
| style="| Rams  35–24
| Kingdome
| Rams  3–0
|
|-
| 
| style="| Rams  31–10
| Anaheim Stadium
| Rams  4–0
| Final meeting in Greater Los Angeles until 2016.
|-
| 
| style="| Seahawks  23–9
| Kingdome
| Rams  4–1
| 
|-
| 
| style="| Seahawks  17–9
| The Dome at America's Center
| Rams  4–2
| Rams open Trans World Dome (now known as The Dome at America's Center).
|-

|-
| 
| style="| 
| 
| style="| Rams  37–34
| Rams  5–2
| Seahawks temporarily play at Husky Stadium during demolition of the Kingdome.
|-
| 
| | style="| Rams  37–20| style="| Seahawks  30–10| Rams  6–3
| Seahawks move to the NFC West as a result of NFL realignment. Seahawks open Seahawks Stadium (now known as Lumen Field).
|-
| 
| | style="| Rams  27–22| style="| Seahawks  24–23| Rams  7–4
|
|-
| 
| style="| | style="| Rams  23–12| style="| Rams  33–27(OT)| Rams  9–4
|
|-
|- style="background:#f2f2f2; font-weight:bold;"
|  2004 Playoffs
| style="| |
| style="| Rams  27–20|  Rams  10–4
| NFC Wild Card Round. First playoff meeting between the two franchises.
|-
| 
| style="| | style="| Seahawks  37–31| style="| Seahawks  31–16| Rams  10–6
| Seahawks lose Super Bowl XL.
|-
| 
| style="| | style="| Seahawks  30–28| style="| Seahawks  24–22| Rams  10–8
|
|-
| 
| style="| | style="| Seahawks  24–19| style="| Seahawks  33–6| Tie  10–10
|
|-
| 
| style="| | style="| Seahawks  23–20| style="| Seahawks  37–13| Seahawks  12–10
|
|-
| 
| style="| | style="| Seahawks  27–17| style="| Seahawks  28–0| Seahawks  14–10
| Seahawks win 10 straight meetings (2005–09).
|-

|-
| 
| Tie 1–1| style="| Rams  20–3| style="| Seahawks  16–6| Seahawks  15–11
| Seattle clinched the NFC West and eliminated the Rams with a week 17 win as the Seahawks become the first team with a losing record since  to make the playoffs.
|-
| 
| style="| | style="| Seahawks  24–7| style="| Seahawks  30–13| Seahawks  17–11
|
|-
| 
| Tie 1–1| style="| Rams  19–13| style="| Seahawks  20–13| Seahawks  18-12
| Seahawks draft Russell Wilson.
|-
| 
| style="| | style="| Seahawks  14–9| style="| Seahawks  27–9| Seahawks  20–12
| Seahawks win Super Bowl XLVIII.
|-
| 
| Tie 1–1| style="| Rams  28–26| style="| Seahawks  20–6| Seahawks  21–13
| Seahawks win 10 straight home meetings (2005-14).  Seahawks lose Super Bowl XLIX.
|-
| 
| style="| | style="| Rams  34–31(OT)| style="| Rams  23–17| Seahawks  21–15
| Rams' first win in Seattle since 2004 and sweep season series for first time since 2004. Final meeting between the two teams in St. Louis.
|-
| 
| Tie 1–1| style="| Rams  9–3| style="| Seahawks  24–3| Seahawks  22–16
| Rams draft Jared Goff. Rams return to Los Angeles after 21 seasons in St. Louis.
|-
| 
| Tie 1–1| style="|Seahawks  16–10| style="| Rams  42–7| Seahawks  23–17
| Rams set the largest winning margin in the series.
|-
| 
| style="| | style="| Rams  33–31| style="| Rams  36–31| Seahawks  23–19
| Rams sweep the NFC West for the first time since 1999. Rams lose Super Bowl LIII.
|-
| 
| Tie 1–1| style="| Rams  28–12| style="| Seahawks  30–29| Seahawks  24–20
| 
|-

|-
| 
| Tie 1–1| style="| Rams  23–16| style="| Seahawks  20–9| Seahawks  25–21
| No fans in attendance for either game due to COVID-19 pandemic. Rams open SoFi Stadium.
|-
|- style="background:#f2f2f2; font-weight:bold;"
|  2020 Playoffs
| style="| |
| style="| Rams  30–20|  Seahawks  25–22
|  NFC Wild Card Round.
|-
| 
| style="| | style="| Rams  20–10| style="| Rams  26–17| Seahawks  25–24
| Rams acquire Matthew Stafford. Final start in the series for Russell Wilson. Rams win Super Bowl LVI.
|-
| 
| style="| | style="| Seahawks  27–23| style="| Seahawks  19–16(OT)| Seahawks  27–24
| Bobby Wagner is released from the Seahawks and signs with the Rams, while Russell Wilson is traded to the Denver Broncos. The Seahawks sweep the Rams for the first time since 2013, and for the first time since the Rams relocated to LA. Rams finish the season with a 5–12 record, becoming the worst defending champion in the Super Bowl era.
|-

|-
| Regular season
| style="|| Rams 14–10
| Seahawks 17–8
| Rams lead the series in Los Angeles 7–2 and Seattle won the series in St. Louis 8–7
|-
| Postseason
| style="|| no games
| Rams 2–0
| NFC Wild Card Game: 2004, 2020
|-
| Regular and postseason
| style="|'''
| Rams 14–10
| Seahawks 17–10
|
|-

Connections between the teams

References

General
 Rams vs Seahawks Results

Specific

National Football League rivalries
Los Angeles Rams
Seattle Seahawks
Seattle Seahawks rivalries
Los Angeles Rams rivalries